Theatre Du Taur Concert, 1975  (also known as Akt IV) is an official bootleg live album by the French rock band Magma. It was recorded in Toulouse on 24 September 1975 but it was not released until 1994.

The live version of "Mekanïk Destruktïw Kommandöh" recorded here is very distinct from the studio releases, as it features prominent instrumental contributions and improvisations by Didier Lockwood on violin and Bernard Paganotti on bass.

Track listing 
 "Köhntarkösz" - 32:29
 "Hhaï" - 11:19
 "Kobaïa" - 11:48
 "Mëkanïk Dëstruktïẁ Kömmandöh" - 38:16

Line-up 
 Klaus Blasquiz - vocals & percussion
 Stella Vander - vocals
 Didier Lockwood - violin
 Gabriel Federow - guitar
 Benoit Widemann - keyboards
 Patrick Gauthier - keyboards
 Bernard Paganotti - bass
 Christian Vander - drums

References

Magma (band) albums
1994 live albums